Pachydactylus amoenus, also known as Namaqua banded gecko or Kamaggas gecko, is a species of lizard in the family Gekkonidae. It is endemic to South Africa.

References

Pachydactylus
Endemic reptiles of South Africa
Reptiles described in 1910
Taxa named by Franz Werner